Eupithecia egenaria, the pauper pug,  is a moth of the family Geometridae. It is known from almost all of Europe, except Portugal, Ireland and the southern part of the Balkan Peninsula.

The wingspan is 21–24 mm. There is one generation per year with adults on wing from May to June.

The larvae feed on Tilia species. Larvae can be found from June to August. It overwinters as a pupa.

References

External links

Lepiforum.de

Moths described in 1848
egenaria
Moths of Europe
Taxa named by Gottlieb August Wilhelm Herrich-Schäffer